Nigerian aristocracy may refer to:

 Nigerian traditional rulers, Nigeria's statutory monarchs

 Subordinate titleholders in the Nigerian chieftaincy system

 Members of the country's  political elite, many of whom are holders of chiefly titles

 Members of the country's  corporate elite, many of whom are holders of chiefly titles